Romolo Murri (Monte San Pietrangeli, 27 August 1870 – Roma, 12 March 1944) was an Italian politician and ecclesiastic. This Catholic priest was suspended for having joined the party Lega Democratica Nazionale and is widely considered in Italy as the precursor of Christian democracy.

In 1894 was a promoter of the FUCI, in 1901 of Democrazia Cristiana Italiana and in 1905 of Lega Democratica Nazionale. He founded the publications "Vita nova" (1895), "Cultura sociale" (1898), "Il domani d'Italia" (1901), "Rivista di cultura" (1906), "Il commento" (1910).

In strong controversy, therefore, with the ecclesiastical hierarchies (following numerous appeals and as many acts of submission), he was finally suspended a divinis in 1907 and after founded the National Democratic League, being a candidate in the elections of 1909, in the lists of the Lega Democratica Nazionale, being elected to the Chamber of the deputies, he was excommunicated in 1909 and married in 1912 in Rome with Ragnhild Lund, daughter of the former president of Lagting (the upper house of the Norwegian Parliament), with whom he had a son. He was devoted himself to journalism and in 1943 reconciled with the Church, but Pius XII having demanded of him no disavowal of his past social and political positions.

Works
In addition to the numerous writings in the aforementioned periodicals in which he participated, Murri wrote some essays.

 Catholic Conservatives and Christian Democrats, 1900
 Class organization and professional unions, 1901
 Battles of today, 1901-1904 [collection of articles published in «Cultura Sociale»]
 Social Summary, 1906
 Clerical politics and democracy, Cesaro, Ascoli Piceno, 1908
 Spain and the Vatican, Milan, Treves Brothers, 1911
 War profiles, Milan: Italian Publishing Institute, 1917
 From Christian Democracy to the Italian Popular Party, 1920
 The ideal conquest of the state, Milan: Imperia, 1923
 Faith and Fascism, Rome, 1924
 The contemporary spiritual crisis. Origins - Orientations, 1932
 Cavour, Rome: Formiggini, 1936
 The universal idea of ​​Rome, Milan: Bompiani, 1937
 The Christian Message and History, 1943

References

External links
 
 

1870 births
People temporarily excommunicated by the Catholic Church
1944 deaths
19th-century Italian Roman Catholic priests
20th-century Italian Roman Catholic priests
People from the Province of Fermo